In reptiles, the supraciliary scales are the scales located immediately above the eyes, and under the supraocular scales. Can be seen as the eyebrow of some reptiles.

References

Herpetology